Bay of Quinte is a provincial electoral district in Ontario, Canada, centered on the Bay of Quinte. It elects one member to the Legislative Assembly of Ontario. This riding was created in 2015.

Members of Provincial Parliament

Election results

References

External links 
2018 Riding map from Elections Ontario

Ontario provincial electoral districts